Jonelle Price (née Richards) (born 14 October 1980) is a New Zealand equestrian, competing in eventing. She is married to Tim Price, also a New Zeland eventing rider. They are both competing at top international level.

At the 2012 Summer Olympics she won the bronze medal in Team eventing. In 2018, she won the Badminton Horse Trials in England. and also won the Luhmuhlen Horse Trials on Maggie in 2018.

Price also runs a farm business with husband, Tim Price. Jonelle won Badminton in 2018, after many unsuccessful attempts, on the black mare, Classic Moet. Jonelle had taken a year out to have a baby, but a week after having her child, got back to riding. Tim price, her husband, also got placed at 2018's Badminton Horse Trials, on their gelding, Ringwood Sky Boy. When asked to describe each other, Jonelle said that Tim was a more talented rider and Tim said that she was more competitive. Classic Moet was predicted to have one of the fastest cross country rounds as she is known to be an incredibly speedy little horse, she certainly proved this at Badminton.

CCI***** results

International championship results

Notable horses 
 Flintstar – 2000 Bay Thoroughbred Gelding (Zabalu x Kingcroft Wicklow)
 2012 London Olympics – Team Bronze Medal, Individual 32nd Place
 Classic Moet – 2002 Black Mare (Classic x Bohemond)
 2014 Caen World Equestrian Games – Individual 4th Place
 2015 Burghley Horse Trials - Individual 5th Place
 2016 Badminton Horse Trials – Individual 10th
 2016 Burghley Horse Trials - Individual 3rd Place
 2018 Badminton Horse Trials – Winner
 2018 Tryon World Equestrian Games, Team 7th, Individual 19th
 2021 Kentucky Horse Trials - Individual 7th  
 2022 Badminton Horse Trials – Individual 11th
 2022 Burghley Horse Trials - Individual 4th Place
 OBOS Impressive – 2009 Bay Irish Sport Horse Mare (OBOS Quality x Lanceston)
 2016 FEI Eventing Young Horse World Championships – 39th Place
 Cooley Showtime – 2009 Bay Dutch Warmblood Gelding (Chin Chin x Julio Mariner XX)
 2016 FEI Eventing Young Horse World Championships – Bronze Medal
 Faerie Dianimo – 2005 Gray British Sport Horse Mare (DiMaggio x Catherston Dazzler)
 2014 Pau Horse Trials - Individual 4th Place
 2015 Luhmuhlen Horse Trials - Individual 2nd Place
 2016 Rio Olympics – Team 4th Place, Individual 17th Place
 2017 Pau Horse Trials - Individual 10th Place
 2018 Luhmuhlen Horse Trials – Winner
 McClaren - 2007 Bay Holsteiner gelding (Clarimo Ask x Toni 1)
 2021 Pau Horse Trials - Individual 3rd Place
 2022 Pratoni World Eventing Championships - Team Bronze medal, individual 10th Place

References

1980 births
Living people
Olympic equestrians of New Zealand
New Zealand female equestrians
Olympic bronze medalists for New Zealand
Equestrians at the 2012 Summer Olympics
Olympic medalists in equestrian
Medalists at the 2012 Summer Olympics
Equestrians at the 2016 Summer Olympics
Equestrians at the 2020 Summer Olympics